Women's Studies International Forum is a bimonthly peer-reviewed academic journal covering feminist research in the area of women's studies and other disciplines. The journal is published by Elsevier and its editor-in-chief is Kalwant Bhopal (University of Birmingham).

History
The journal was established in 1978 as Women's Studies International Quarterly, obtaining its current name in 1982.

Abstracting and indexing

According to the Journal Citation Reports, the journal has a 2021 impact factor of 1.736.

See also
List of women's studies journals

References

External links

Bimonthly journals
Elsevier academic journals
Publications established in 1978
Women's studies journals
English-language journals